Lancaster is an unincorporated community in Smith County, Tennessee, United States, located  southeast of Gordonsville. Lancaster had a post office with ZIP code 38569, which closed on March 4, 2011, due to the United States Postal Service closing smaller post offices around the country.

As of 2010, the population of Lancaster's zip code tabulation area was 363. The community is situated along State Highway 141 between Gordonsville and Center Hill Lake, and is drained by Smith Fork, a tributary of the Caney Fork. Lancaster is named for John Lancaster, Jr., an early settler who arrived in the area in the late 18th century (his family still owns a farm in the area, which has been designated a Tennessee Century Farm).

See also
Temperance Hall, Tennessee – a community of similar size located just to the southwest in DeKalb County

References

Unincorporated communities in Smith County, Tennessee
Unincorporated communities in Tennessee